The arrondissement of Bourg-en-Bresse is an arrondissement of France in the Ain department in the Auvergne-Rhône-Alpes region. It has 199 communes.

Composition

The communes of the arrondissement of Bourg-en-Bresse, and their INSEE codes, are:
 
 L'Abergement-Clémenciat (01001)
 Ambérieux-en-Dombes (01005)
 Arbigny (01016)
 Ars-sur-Formans (01021)
 Asnières-sur-Saône (01023)
 Attignat (01024)
 Bâgé-Dommartin (01025)
 Bâgé-le-Châtel (01026)
 Balan (01027)
 Baneins (01028)
 Beaupont (01029)
 Beauregard (01030)
 Béligneux (01032)
 Bény (01038)
 Béréziat (01040)
 Bey (01042)
 Beynost (01043)
 Birieux (01045)
 Biziat (01046)
 Bohas-Meyriat-Rignat (01245)
 La Boisse (01049)
 Boissey (01050)
 Bouligneux (01052)
 Bourg-en-Bresse (01053)
 Boz (01057)
 Bresse Vallons (01130)
 Bressolles (01062)
 Buellas (01065)
 Certines (01069)
 Ceyzériat (01072)
 Chalamont (01074)
 Chaleins (01075)
 Chaneins (01083)
 Chanoz-Châtenay (01084)
 La Chapelle-du-Châtelard (01085)
 Châtenay (01090)
 Châtillon-la-Palud (01092)
 Châtillon-sur-Chalaronne (01093)
 Chavannes-sur-Reyssouze (01094)
 Chaveyriat (01096)
 Chevroux (01102)
 Civrieux (01105)
 Cize (01106)
 Coligny (01108)
 Condeissiat (01113)
 Confrançon (01115)
 Cormoranche-sur-Saône (01123)
 Cormoz (01124)
 Corveissiat (01125)
 Courmangoux (01127)
 Courtes (01128)
 Crans (01129)
 Crottet (01134)
 Cruzilles-lès-Mépillat (01136)
 Curciat-Dongalon (01139)
 Curtafond (01140)
 Dagneux (01142)
 Dompierre-sur-Chalaronne (01146)
 Dompierre-sur-Veyle (01145)
 Domsure (01147)
 Drom (01150)
 Druillat (01151)
 Fareins (01157)
 Feillens (01159)
 Foissiat (01163)
 Francheleins (01165)
 Frans (01166)
 Garnerans (01167)
 Genouilleux (01169)
 Gorrevod (01175)
 Grand-Corent (01177)
 Grièges (01179)
 Guéreins (01183)
 Hautecourt-Romanèche (01184)
 Illiat (01188)
 Jassans-Riottier (01194)
 Jasseron (01195)
 Jayat (01196)
 Journans (01197)
 Laiz (01203)
 Lapeyrouse (01207)
 Lent (01211)
 Lescheroux (01212)
 Lurcy (01225)
 Malafretaz (01229)
 Mantenay-Montlin (01230)
 Manziat (01231)
 Marboz (01232)
 Marlieux (01235)
 Marsonnas (01236)
 Massieux (01238)
 Meillonnas (01241)
 Messimy-sur-Saône (01243)
 Mézériat (01246)
 Mionnay (01248)
 Miribel (01249)
 Misérieux (01250)
 Mogneneins (01252)
 Montagnat (01254)
 Montceaux (01258)
 Montcet (01259)
 Monthieux (01261)
 Montluel (01262)
 Montmerle-sur-Saône (01263)
 Montracol (01264)
 Montrevel-en-Bresse (01266)
 Neuville-les-Dames (01272)
 Neyron (01275)
 Niévroz (01276)
 Nivigne et Suran (01095)
 Ozan (01284)
 Parcieux (01285)
 Péronnas (01289)
 Perrex (01291)
 Peyzieux-sur-Saône (01295)
 Pirajoux (01296)
 Pizay (01297)
 Le Plantay (01299)
 Polliat (01301)
 Pont-de-Vaux (01305)
 Pont-de-Veyle (01306)
 Pouillat (01309)
 Ramasse (01317)
 Rancé (01318)
 Relevant (01319)
 Replonges (01320)
 Revonnas (01321)
 Reyrieux (01322)
 Reyssouze (01323)
 Romans (01328)
 Saint-André-de-Bâgé (01332)
 Saint-André-de-Corcy (01333)
 Saint-André-d'Huiriat (01334)
 Saint-André-le-Bouchoux (01335)
 Saint-André-sur-Vieux-Jonc (01336)
 Saint-Bénigne (01337)
 Saint-Bernard (01339)
 Saint-Cyr-sur-Menthon (01343)
 Saint-Denis-lès-Bourg (01344)
 Saint-Didier-d'Aussiat (01346)
 Saint-Didier-de-Formans (01347)
 Saint-Didier-sur-Chalaronne (01348)
 Sainte-Croix (01342)
 Sainte-Euphémie (01353)
 Sainte-Olive (01382)
 Saint-Étienne-du-Bois (01350)
 Saint-Étienne-sur-Chalaronne (01351)
 Saint-Étienne-sur-Reyssouze (01352)
 Saint-Genis-sur-Menthon (01355)
 Saint-Georges-sur-Renon (01356)
 Saint-Germain-sur-Renon (01359)
 Saint-Jean-de-Thurigneux (01362)
 Saint-Jean-sur-Reyssouze (01364)
 Saint-Jean-sur-Veyle (01365)
 Saint-Julien-sur-Reyssouze (01367)
 Saint-Julien-sur-Veyle (01368)
 Saint-Just (01369)
 Saint-Laurent-sur-Saône (01370)
 Saint-Marcel (01371)
 Saint-Martin-du-Mont (01374)
 Saint-Martin-le-Châtel (01375)
 Saint-Maurice-de-Beynost (01376)
 Saint-Nizier-le-Bouchoux (01380)
 Saint-Nizier-le-Désert (01381)
 Saint-Paul-de-Varax (01383)
 Saint-Rémy (01385)
 Saint-Sulpice (01387)
 Saint-Trivier-de-Courtes (01388)
 Saint-Trivier-sur-Moignans (01389)
 Salavre (01391)
 Sandrans (01393)
 Savigneux (01398)
 Sermoyer (01402)
 Servas (01405)
 Servignat (01406)
 Simandre-sur-Suran (01408)
 Sulignat (01412)
 Thil (01418)
 Thoissey (01420)
 Tossiat (01422)
 Toussieux (01423)
 Tramoyes (01424)
 La Tranclière (01425)
 Trévoux (01427)
 Valeins (01428)
 Val-Revermont (01426)
 Vandeins (01429)
 Verjon (01432)
 Vernoux (01433)
 Versailleux (01434)
 Vescours (01437)
 Vésines (01439)
 Villars-les-Dombes (01443)
 Villemotier (01445)
 Villeneuve (01446)
 Villereversure (01447)
 Villette-sur-Ain (01449)
 Viriat (01451)
 Vonnas (01457)

History

The arrondissement of Bourg-en-Bresse was created in 1800. At the January 2017 reorganization of the arrondissements of Ain, it lost 12 communes to the arrondissement of Belley and four to the arrondissement of Nantua.

As a result of the reorganisation of the cantons of France which came into effect in 2015, the borders of the cantons are no longer related to the borders of the arrondissements. The cantons of the arrondissement of Bourg-en-Bresse were, as of January 2015:

 Bâgé-le-Châtel
 Bourg-en-Bresse-Est
 Bourg-en-Bresse-Nord-Centre
 Bourg-en-Bresse-Sud
 Ceyzériat
 Chalamont
 Châtillon-sur-Chalaronne
 Coligny
 Meximieux
 Miribel
 Montluel
 Montrevel-en-Bresse
 Péronnas
 Pont-d'Ain
 Pont-de-Vaux
 Pont-de-Veyle
 Reyrieux
 Saint-Trivier-de-Courtes
 Saint-Trivier-sur-Moignans
 Thoissey
 Treffort-Cuisiat
 Trévoux
 Villars-les-Dombes
 Viriat

References

Bourg-en-Bresse